Kevin Carolan (born May 22, 1968, in Bronx, NY) is an American actor and comedian. During his career, he has had roles on television, stage, and film.

Career
Carolan studied theatre at Montclair State University in New Jersey in the late 1980s.

His Broadway/National Tour credits include: Newsies (Roosevelt), Chicago (Amos), Dirty Blonde (Charlie). City Center Encores!: Pardon My English, The Ritz and most recently, Come From Away.

His regional theater credits include: Baloo in the world premiere of The Jungle Book musical directed by Mary Zimmerman (Goodman Theatre/Huntington Theatre), Lips Together, Teeth Apart (George Street Playhouse); A Thousand Clowns (Studio Arena); Dirty Blonde (GSP, Wilma Theatre, Hangar Theatre); Kudzu (Ford's Theater, Goodspeed)., Happy Days the Musical, A Streetcar Named Desire.

His television appearances include: Boardwalk Empire, The Middle, Sonny With a Chance, Fringe, All My Children, White Collar, Curb Your Enthusiasm, Spin City, Trinity (recurring), Orange Is the New Black, and the  Law & Order franchise.

He was named Newark Star-Ledger's Best Featured Actor, 1999; nominee, 2004.

Private life
Carolan was married to writer Maryann Carolan. They have two children together, Kate and Jack.
Kevin Carolan was raised in Wanaque, New Jersey and attended St Francis Parochial Elementary School and Neumann Prep High School.

External links
 
 
 http://www.kevincarolan.com
 http://www.playbillvault.com/Person/Detail/46988/Kevin-Carolan

American male stage actors
American male television actors
1968 births
Living people
Montclair State University alumni
People from Wanaque, New Jersey
Place of birth missing (living people)